Sarah Begum Kabori (also Kabori Sarwar; born Mina Pal, 19 July 1950 – 17 April 2021) was a Bangladeshi film actress and politician. Her notable films include Sutorang, Sareng Bou, Abhirbhab, Shat Bhai Champa,  Sujon Sokhi and Lalon Fokir. She received the Bangladesh National Film Award for Best Actress for her role in the film Sareng Bou (1978) and Lifetime Achievement Award in 2013.

Kabori got involved into politics later in her life. She became an elected member of parliament from the Narayanganj-4 constituency as an Awami League politician in 2008 and served until 2014.

Early life
Kabori was born in Boalkhali, Chittagong, East Bengal, Pakistan. She studied until 8th grade. Her father, Krisna Das Paul, was a Bhajan singer and her mother used to recite verses from religious books. Kabori was born in a cultural based family. Her siblings knew how to dance and sing. And her brother could play the tabla.

Film career

Kabori debuted in film industry at the age of 13. Her first film Sutorang, directed by Subhash Dutta, was released in 1964. She earned the role through the music director Satya Saha. Kabori starred with Razzak in more than 20 films together since Dutta's Abirbhab in 1968; the films include Nil Akasher Niche (1969), Deep Nebhe Nai (1970), and Ka Kha Ga Gha Umo (1970).

Kabori acted in several films with Farooque in the 1970s, notably Sujon Sokhi and Sareng Bou. She also starred with Bulbul Ahmed in Chashi Nazrul Islam's Devdas (1982). She acted in the 1973 film Titash Ekti Nadir Naam by Ritwik Ghatak, an Indian filmmaker. She also acted in an Urdu film Bahana by Zahir Raihan with co-actor Rahman. She also worked with other actors including Alamgir, Sohel Rana, Uzzal, Wasim, Khan Ataur Rahman, Golam Mustafa, Anwar Hossain and A.T.M. Shamsuzzaman.

In 2006, Kabori directed the film Ayna.

Kabori authored a book titled "Sritituku Thaak".

Political career
In 2008, Kabori was elected to the National Parliament in Bangladesh from Narayanganj-4 for 9th Bangladesh Parliament. During 1971 Liberation War, she participated by donating blood to help the freedom fighters. She had fled to India during the war and worked on a film, "Joy Bangladesh", in Mumbai.

Personal life
Kabori first married Chitta Chowdhury. After the divorce from Chowdhury, she married Shafiuddin Sarwar in 1978. Sarwar is an uncle of politician Shamim Osman. The couple was divorced in 2008.  She had five sons.

Death and legacy 
After testing positive for COVID-19, Kabori was first admitted to Kurmitola General Hospital and later, was shifted to the ICU in Sheikh Russel National Gastroliver Institute and Hospital where she died on 17 April 2021. She had been working on a film titled Ei Tumi Shei Tumi since 2019.

The 1969 Ka Kha Ga Gha Umo film was shot in Chuadanga. The crew stayed at a house called Setab Manzil. The road around the house started going by the name Kabori Road after Kabori which became official in February 2017.

Filmography

Awards

References

External links
 

2021 deaths
1950 births
People from Chittagong
Bangladeshi film actresses
Bangladeshi actor-politicians
Awami League politicians
Actresses in Bengali cinema
Bangladeshi expatriate actresses in India
Actresses in Hindi cinema
Best Actress National Film Awards (Bangladesh) winners
9th Jatiya Sangsad members
Women members of the Jatiya Sangsad
Bangladeshi Hindus
Meril-Prothom Alo Lifetime Achievement Award winners
Best Actress Bachsas Award winners
National Film Award (Bangladesh) for Lifetime Achievement recipients
Deaths from the COVID-19 pandemic in Bangladesh
20th-century Bangladeshi actresses
21st-century Bangladeshi women politicians